DYUB (107.7 FM), broadcasting as 107.7 Energy FM, is a radio station owned by Ultrasonic Broadcasting System and operated by Media Z Network Management and Marketing. Its studios are located at the 3rd floor, ACP Center Bldg., Acevedo St. cor. Roxas Ave., Brgy. Poblacion, Kalibo.

It started operations in 2010 as Bay Radio under Baycomms and was later on known as Kasimanwa Radyo. In 2013, UBSI acquired the station and rebranded it as Energy FM. It initially simulcasted most of its flagship Manila station's programs until around 2016, when it started producing its own programs.

References

Radio stations in Aklan
Radio stations established in 2010